This is a list of Ohio Bobcats women's basketball head coaches

Source: Ohio Basketball Media Guide

References

Ohio

Ohio Bobcats basketbeall, women's, coaches